Lorraine Besser (born July 29, 1973) is an American philosopher and Professor of Philosophy at Middlebury College. She is known for her works on moral philosophy.

Books
 The Philosophy of Happiness: An Interdisciplinary Introduction, Routledge Press 2021
 Eudaimonic Ethics: The Philosophy and Psychology of Living Well, Routledge Press 2014
 The Routledge Companion to Virtue Ethics, Co-edited with Michael Slote, Routledge Press 2015

References

21st-century American philosophers
Philosophy academics
Moral psychologists
Living people
Academic staff of the University of Waterloo
Middlebury College faculty
American women philosophers
1973 births